"The Night of the Doctor" is a mini-episode of the British science fiction television programme Doctor Who. It was made available on BBC iPlayer and YouTube on 14 November 2013, as part of the BBC One lead-up to the show's 50th anniversary special. It was written by Steven Moffat and starred Paul McGann as the Doctor.

The episode is set during the Time War and shows the previously unseen last moments of the Eighth Doctor (McGann) and his artificially controlled regeneration into the War Doctor (John Hurt). It is McGann's second on-screen appearance as the Doctor, following his debut in the 1996 television film.

Synopsis
During the Time War, the Eighth Doctor attempts to rescue a pilot, Cass, whose spacecraft is crashing into the planet Karn. When Cass realises that the Doctor is a Time Lord, she refuses his aid, ignoring his claims that he has never taken part in the devastating Time War. The Doctor refuses to abandon Cass, and both are killed when the ship crashes.

On the planet, the Doctor is taken in by the Sisterhood of Karn, guardians of the Flame and Elixir of Eternal Life, who revive him temporarily; Cass, however, is beyond their help. The Sisterhood offer the Doctor a selection of potions which, if consumed before he expires, will not only trigger his regeneration into a new form, but allow him to choose which characteristics his next incarnation will have. They convince the Doctor that he must take action to end the Time War, which "threatens all reality". The Doctor initially refuses, but after seeing Cass's dead body, he agrees there is not much need for a doctor any more and asks for a potion that will turn him into "a warrior". Saluting the memory of his past companions, he drinks the potion and regenerates into a new incarnation, known as the War Doctor, who wears Cass's bandolier.

Continuity
Before regenerating, the Doctor mentions Charley Pollard, C'rizz, Lucie Miller, Tamsin Drew, and Molly O'Sullivan, his companions in audio dramas produced by Big Finish Productions. This marks the first time that original characters from the Big Finish audio series have been mentioned in the television show. Karn and the Sisterhood also appeared in Eighth Doctor stories, but debuted in the television show in The Brain of Morbius, a 1976 Fourth Doctor story.

The name of the priestess in this story, Ohila, is similar to Ohica, the name of the High Priestess of the Sisterhood in The Brain of Morbius, although no direct connection between the two characters is established.

Production

The idea for "The Night of the Doctor" came following the creation of the previously unknown incarnation of the Doctor played by John Hurt in "The Name of the Doctor". Steven Moffat decided that he wanted to see how this Doctor came into being, with the best story idea being a direct regeneration from the Eighth Doctor, which would have the added benefit of showing the end of the Eighth Doctor, which Moffat had always wanted to see. Having contacted Paul McGann, who indicated his willingness to participate, Moffat then constructed the mini-episode to serve as an additional surprise for the fans, as well as serving as an introductory piece to "The Day of the Doctor".

"The Night of the Doctor" was recorded at Roath Lock on 7–8 May 2013; the first day of filming consisted of all scenes taking place on the planet Karn, while the second day consisted of scenes in Cass' spaceship. Rather than a return to the costume from the TV movie or using the new image that Big Finish had introduced, Moffat decided on a variation of the TV movie outfit designed by Howard Burden. The new outfit referenced the previous one, retaining the long green coat and grey waistcoat, but making it appear more of an "adventurer's" rather than "gentleman's" outfit. At the same time, pictures of McGann in costume were taken on the Eleventh Doctor's TARDIS console room set.

An archival photograph of John Hurt as Rodion Raskolnikov in the 1979 BBC adaptation of Crime and Punishment was used to represent the reflection of the young War Doctor.

Broadcast and reception
The broadcast of the episode came as a surprise to viewers, as it was announced via Twitter less than an hour before its release. The appearance of Paul McGann was similarly unexpected. The mini-episode was intended to be released during the actual week of the anniversary, but was brought forward owing to the fact that its existence, as well as the surprise presence of McGann as the Eighth Doctor, were about to be leaked. The Atlantic listed "The Night of the Doctor" as one of the best television episodes of 2013.

The episode was made available on the BBC's YouTube site, its iPlayer service, and on the BBC Red Button service. "The Night of the Doctor" received over 2.5 million views within the week of its release. McGann's reprise performance was met with acclaim; fans of the episode campaigned for the BBC to grant the Eighth Doctor his own spin-off series, with one petition on Change.org accumulating over 15,000 signatures.

BBC America aired the episode on 25 December 2013 as part of an expanded broadcast of "The Day of the Doctor" including deleted scenes excluded from the normal US broadcast honouring the 50th Anniversary as well as Matt Smith's final episode which aired immediately following it and his farewell special.

Fan reaction
After the release of the mini-episode, fans of Doctor Who demanded a Doctor Who spin-off featuring McGann, multi-Doctor stories between McGann and Peter Capaldi's Twelfth Doctor, or further specials or mini-episodes with McGann. A petition for a spin-off passed the goal of 15,000 signatures in November 2013, but extended the goal to 25,000 and has since then surpassed 20,000 signatures. Paul McGann indicated his willingness to return and noted that he had signed the petition himself. Emma Campbell-Jones, who played Cass, indicated a willingness to return also, noting that it isn't explicit that Cass died and that the character "needs to see that he is the good Doctor."

However, Doctor Who showrunner Steven Moffat indicated that a McGann spin-off would not happen as, with the exception of the anniversary, there should be "one Doctor at a time." He also indicated that McGann's appearance was less important than the fact that his appearance was a surprise and stated that further mini-episodes with high production values would be produced and would be surprising for viewers and even the BBC.

Home media
The episode was included as an extra on the Blu-ray and DVD release of '"The Day of the Doctor'". The special was re-released on DVD and Blu-ray on 8 September 2014 as part of a "50th Anniversary Collectors Edition" boxset alongside "The Name of the Doctor", An Adventure in Space and Time, "The Day of the Doctor", "The Time of the Doctor" and The Five(ish) Doctors Reboot. The episode was also released again as an extra feature on the Blu Ray release of Doctor Who: The Movie on 19 September 2016.

In print
The storyline from this episode was included in the novelisation of "The Day of the Doctor". It was stated in the novelisation (which, like this episode, was written by Steven Moffat) that the potion the Doctor drank to become a warrior was a fake, intended by Ohila to convince him to fight in the Time War.

References

External links

Eighth Doctor stories
War Doctor stories
Television episodes written by Steven Moffat
2013 British television episodes
Doctor Who mini-episodes
Doctor Who serials novelised by Steven Moffat
Doctor Who regeneration stories